Françoise Cachin (8 May 1936, Paris – 4 February 2011, Paris) was a French art historian and curator. She was the founding director of the Musée d’Orsay and the author of numerous books on 19th-century French painting.

Life 
Françoise Cachin was born to the pediatrician Charles Cachin and his wife Ginette (née Signac). Her grandparents included the communist politician Marcel Cachin and the pointillist painters Paul Signac and Jeanne Selmersheim-Desgrange.

Cachin studied art history under André Chastel at the Institut d'Art et d'Archéologie of the University of Paris. After training at the Louvre and the Galerie nationale du Jeu de Paume, she worked as a curator at the Musée National d'Art Moderne from 1969 to 1978, eventually becoming chief curator. In this capacity she organized numerous exhibitions, including an important Paul Klee retrospective, and oversaw the museum's move from the Palais de Tokyo to the new Centre Georges Pompidou.

In 1978 Cachin joined the planning team for the new Musée d'Orsay. During this time she continued to organize exhibitions, including a major Manet retrospective in 1983. When the Musée d'Orsay opened in 1986 she was named director, and in this role organized retrospectives of Paul Gauguin (1989) and Georges Seurat (1991).

In 1994 Cachin left the head of the Musée d'Orsay and assumed the post of Director of French Museums, which carried the responsibility for over 1,000 museums across France. Despite this, she still found time to compile a catalogue raisonné of works by her grandfather Paul Signac, which was published in 2000.

Cachin retired from her directorial position in 2001 but remained active in the museum world. She helped found the French Regional & American Museums Exchange (FRAME), and (unsuccessfully) lead opposition to the Louvre's plan to construct the Louvre Abu Dhabi. In 2009 she was named a Grand Officier of the Ordre national du Mérite.

Cachin died on 4 February 2011 of amyloidosis, aged 74. She was at work editing the journals of Paul Signac.

Selected works
 
 Gauguin : « Ce malgré moi de sauvage », collection « Découvertes Gallimard » (nº 49), série Arts. Éditions Gallimard, 1989, new edition in 2017
 UK edition – Gauguin: The Quest for Paradise, 'New Horizons' series. Thames & Hudson, 1992
 US edition – Gauguin: The Quest for Paradise, "Abrams Discoveries" series. Harry N. Abrams, 1992
 Seurat : Le rêve de l'art-science, collection « Découvertes Gallimard » (nº 108), série Arts. Éditions Gallimard, 1991
 Manet : « J'ai fait ce que j'ai vu », collection « Découvertes Gallimard » (nº 203), série Arts. Éditions Gallimard, 1994, new edition in 2011
 UK edition – Manet: Painter of Modern Life, 'New Horizons' series. Thames & Hudson, 1995
 US edition – Manet: The Influence of the Modern, "Abrams Discoveries" series. Harry N. Abrams, 1995

References

Further reading 
 Paul Josefowitz: Personality of the year: Françoise Cachin, Directeur des musées de France. Apollo Nr. 140, pp. 14–17, London, December 1994.
 Denis Picard: "Une directrice pour les Musées de France". Connaissance des Arts. Nr. 583, May 2001, p. 39.
 Henri Loyrette: Mélanges en hommage à Françoise Cachin. Réunion des Musées Nationaux and Gallimard, Paris 2002, .

1936 births
2011 deaths
French art historians
Writers from Paris
Grand Officers of the Ordre national du Mérite
French curators
French people of Breton descent
Women art historians
French women historians
French women curators